Per M. Goverud (1 October 1905 – 10 September 1976) was a Norwegian politician for the Centre Party.

He served as a deputy representative to the Parliament of Norway from Vestfold during the term 1958–1961. In total he met during 26 days of parliamentary session. He hailed from Hof.

References

1905 births
1976 deaths
People from Hof, Vestfold
Deputy members of the Storting
Centre Party (Norway) politicians
Vestfold politicians